Polar Electro Oy (globally known as Polar) is a manufacturer of sports training computers,  particularly known for developing the world's first wireless heart rate monitor.

The company is based in Kempele, Finland and was founded in 1977. Polar has approximately 1,200 employees worldwide, it has 26 subsidiaries that supply over 35,000 retail outlets in more than 80 countries. Polar manufactures a range of heart rate monitoring devices and accessories for athletic training and fitness and also to measure heart rate variability.

History 
In 1975, there was no accurate way to measure heart rate during training, and the idea of a wireless, portable heart rate monitor was conceived on a cross-country skiing track in Finland.
Polar was founded in 1977, and the company filed its first patent for wireless heart rate measurement three years later. Its late founder Seppo Säynäjäkangas (1942–2018) was the inventor of the first wireless EKG heart rate monitor. In 1978, the company launched its first commercial product, the Tunturi Pulser. In 1982, Polar launched the world's first wearable wire-free heart rate monitor, the Sport Tester PE 2000.

Today, Polar has products ranging from basic models for beginners to fitness enthusiasts and training systems designed for elite athletes. Polar has also developed heart rate monitoring and training systems for equestrian sports. Polar technology and devices are widely used in various scientific studies, as well as being adopted by many university research departments. In part due to its own history and the affiliation with universities and the scientific community, Polar offers a research co-operation programme focused on supporting studies in exercise science.

In November 2015, Polar released its first optical wrist-reading heart rate monitor, the A360.

In July 2018, Dutch newspaper De Correspondent revealed that Polar's fitness app shows users on the map, making it possible to find out their real names, profession and home addresses. In a reaction, Polar ended some of the online functionality of sharing routes on the map.

Current products

References

Further reading 
 
 
 Hoffman, Michael (December 14, 2009). "Heart-rate monitors help PT flunkers". Military Times.

External links 
 

Finnish companies established in 1977
Electronics companies established in 1977
Sporting goods manufacturers of Finland
Finnish brands
Watch brands
Activity trackers
Kempele